The second series of Junior MasterChef Australia, the second spin off of the Australian reality television series MasterChef Australia, premiered on Sunday, 25 September 2011. Auditions closed on 6 May 2011; children who will be aged between eight and twelve years old during the period from 13 June to 28 October 2011 were eligible. The judging panel consists of Gary Mehigan. George Calombaris, Matt Moran and Anna Gare. Matt Preston, who has been involved in every incarnation of the MasterChef Australia series up to this point, will be taking a step back from the series (also declining a spot as a guest judge on the U.S. version of MasterChef), stating he wants to concentrate on his duties as a food critic. He will be replaced by Matt Moran.

Some parents of prospective participants have been critical of the far-reaching contract required by the program's production company.

Prime Minister Julia Gillard filmed a guest appearance. The show also features a trip to Disneyland California.

The series was won by Greta Yaxley from Claremont, Western Australia.

Top 20

Ratings and episodes

Elimination Table

References

External links

2011 Australian television seasons
MasterChef Australia
Television shows filmed in California